John III or John IV (the enumeration of Amalfitan rulers has never been standardised) was the duke of Amalfi briefly in 1073 by right of succession following the death of his father, Sergius III, in November. John was only an infant when his father died, The Amalfitans, who required a ruler who could defend them, quickly deposed and exiled him. Consequently, given the lack of an adult ruler, Amalfi surrendered to the Normans led by Robert Guiscard.

References
Chronicon Amalfitanum c. 1300.
Caravale, Mario (ed). Dizionario Biografico degli Italiani: LV Ginammi – Giovanni da Crema. Rome, 2000.
Chalandon, Ferdinand. Histoire de la domination normande en Italie et en Sicilie. Paris, 1907.

11th-century dukes of Amalfi